USS Anemone may refer to the following ships of the United States Navy:

 , a steamer in commission from 1864 to 1865
 , a patrol vessel and minelayer in commission from 1917 to 1919

See also
 , a patrol vessel in service from 1917 to 1919

United States Navy ship names